Northwestern State University of Louisiana (NSU) is a public university primarily situated in Natchitoches, Louisiana, with a nursing campus in Shreveport and general campuses in Leesville/Fort Polk and Alexandria. It is a part of the University of Louisiana System.

NSU was founded in 1884 as the Louisiana State Normal School. It was the first school in Louisiana to offer degree programs in nursing and business education. NSU, along with numerous other state colleges, gained university status in 1970 during the administration of President Arnold R. Kilpatrick, a Northwestern State alumnus who served from 1966 to 1978. Kilpatrick succeeded the 12-year president, John S. Kyser, a native of El Paso, Illinois.

NSU was one of the first six colleges to enter into NASA's Joint Venture Program. Students worked with NASA scientists to help analyze data and do research for the 1996 Space Shuttle Columbia shuttle mission. NSU also hosts the Louisiana Scholars' College, Louisiana's designated honors college in the liberal arts and sciences. The Louisiana School for Math, Science, and the Arts, a state-supported residential high school for sophomores, juniors, and seniors, is also located on the campus. It was a brainchild of former State Representative Jimmy D. Long of Natchitoches, who also attended NSU.

NSU offers more than 50 degree programs. Fall 2018 total enrollment was 11,081, the largest in the university's 133-year history, although the school saw enrollments decline during the COVID-19 pandemic, which hampered recruitment efforts.
NSU also claims more than 70,000 alumni.

History

Northwestern State University stands on ground that has been dedicated to learning for well over 100 years. Prior to the American Civil War, a portion of the present campus was the property of the Bullard family of Natchitoches. As early as 1856, the Bullard mansion was in use as a convent by the Religious Society of the Sacred Heart. The following year, a school building was erected at the convent, and in 1884, the town and parish of Natchitoches purchased the property. Three of the four great white columns that once supported the east gable of the mansion still stand on "The Hill" and serve as the unofficial symbols of the university.

In 1884, the Louisiana State Legislature by Act 51 created the Louisiana State Normal School for the preparation of teachers. Shortly thereafter, a freshman member of the Louisiana House of Representatives, Leopold Caspari of Natchitoches, offered the convent site as a campus for the school with the anticipated approval of the citizens of Natchitoches. The offer was accepted, and from 1885 to 1918, the school offered two years of study for the training of teachers. Baccalaureate programs were inaugurated, and the Louisiana Constitution of 1921 changed the name of the school to Louisiana State Normal College. The resources and curricula of "Normal" grew steadily to meet the increasingly diverse requirements of Louisiana's expanding population. In 1944, the institution's excellent service in its broader role was accorded formal recognition by Act 326 of the Legislature, which changed its name to Northwestern State College of Louisiana.

Northwestern State maintained and strengthened its long tradition of leadership in public service and academic endeavor and became, in 1954, the first college under the jurisdiction of the Louisiana State Board of Education to offer a master's degree. The Specialist in Education degree was first offered in 1966 and the Doctor of Philosophy in Education degrees were authorized in 1967. On June 18, 1970, Governor John J. McKeithen signed a legislative act that brought the old campus its greatest distinction, changing its title to Northwestern State University of Louisiana. In 1980, the old campus quadrangle where the columns stand was entered into the National Register of Historic Places under the title "Normal Hill Historic District."

Although primarily a regional institution, Northwestern State also offers an opportunity for education at satellite locations, including Leesville, Shreveport, and Alexandria. In addition to academics, these centers are also developing student-life programs. The Nursing Education Center, located in Shreveport, provides the educational environment for nursing majors enrolled in clinical courses, as well as general education courses. The center houses departments administering masters, baccalaureate, and associate degree programs. The campus includes academic facilities, office space for faculty and staff, a bookstore, and facilities for activities and organizations.

A. A. Fredericks was president of NSU from 1934 to 1941. He was later a member of the Louisiana State Senate and the private secretary on two occasions to Governor Earl Kemp Long. Fredericks obtained his teaching credentials from Northwestern Normal in 1912. The A. A. Fredericks Auditorium on campus commemorates him.

Eugene P. Watson of Natchitoches, for whom the NSU library is named, was head librarian and professor of library science from 1940 until his death in 1964. He founded Alpha Beta Alpha, the national library science fraternity. The group held its first biennial convention on the NSU campus in 1952.

The centennial history of NSU (1884–1984) was published by the NSU Press in 1985 by the historian Marietta LeBreton, who taught 45 years at the institution, from 1963 until her sudden death in 2009.

Vic the Demon
On November 8, 1922, by proclamation of President V. L. Roy and Coach H. Lee Prather, all athletic teams became known as the Demons. The name was decided upon by a contest open to all students, with a grand prize of $10. A committee was appointed by the president to narrow down the names submitted by the student body. The final selection was decided by a vote of the students. The two most popular choices were Braves and Demons. Among other names submitted by students were Sharks, Daredevils, Musketeers, Pelicans, Prather's Ground Hogs, Bloodhounds, Cyclops, and Serpents. The official winners were Aileen Ritter and Truett Scarborough.

On September 22, 1984, the Demon received his official given name by means of another contest sponsored by the athletic department. The contest was open to faculty, staff, and students. The objective was to find a name for the Demon. Over 300 entries were submitted to the committee. The grand prize was an all-expenses-paid weekend at the Louisiana State Fair Classic. Ray Carney, an alumnus of the university, was the official winner with "Vic", which is short for "Victory".

Jim Croce
Singer-songwriter Jim Croce died in a plane crash hours after finishing a 1973 concert on the NSU campus.

Student media

Newspaper and yearbook
Northwestern's student-run weekly newspaper, The Current Sauce, was founded in 1914. In 2021, the newspaper and campus radio station, KNWD, merged their news operations into a shared digital platform, "Purple Media Network." Its annual student-run yearbook is called The Potpourri. Northwestern has digitized its archives of Current Sauce, Potpourri, and other publications to make them more easily accessible.

Radio and television
The student-run radio station is The Demon (KNWD 91.7 FM) and a faculty-administered and student-operated local television station is NSU22, on which can be found biweekly student-produced newscasts.

Literary magazine
NSU's literary magazine is called The Argus. It is student-run and published during the spring semester. The magazine content is provided by competitions in various fields of writing and artwork.

Athletics

The Northwestern State athletic teams go by the Demons, with women's athletic teams generally called the Lady Demons, and its mascot is Vic the Demon. The university is a member of the National Collegiate Athletic Association (NCAA) and competes in the Southland Conference at the NCAA Division I level. Northwestern State sponsors 12 varsity athletic teams, five men's teams and seven women's teams.

Greek life

Sororities

National Panhellenic Conference affiliates
 Delta Zeta 1927 (closed 1985)
 Sigma Sigma Sigma 1928
 Alpha Sigma Alpha 1930–1971; 2002–2013 (closed 2013)
 Alpha Gamma Delta 1959 (closed 1963)
 Sigma Kappa 1959 (closed 1995)
 Phi Mu 1968
 Alpha Omicron Pi 1997

National Pan-Hellenic Council affiliates
 Alpha Kappa Alpha 1973
 Sigma Gamma Rho (Closed 1979. Reinstalled 1990)
 Delta Sigma Theta 1972
 Zeta Phi Beta 1974

Music sororities
 Tau Beta Sigma 1987

Fraternities

National Pan-Hellenic Council affiliates
 Alpha Phi Alpha 1973
 Omega Psi Phi 1972
 Kappa Alpha Psi 1975
 Phi Beta Sigma 1973

North American Interfraternity Conference affiliates
 Pi Kappa Phi 1956
 Tau Kappa Epsilon 1957
 Kappa Alpha Order 1963
 Kappa Sigma 1966
 Theta Chi 1973
 Sigma Nu 1997
 Delta Upsilon (closed 2004)
 Sigma Tau Gamma 1929 (closed 1991)
 Pi Kappa Alpha 2014

Music fraternities
 Phi Mu Alpha Sinfonia 1942
 Kappa Kappa Psi 1986
 Sigma Alpha Iota 1950
 Tau Beta Sigma 1987

Academic and professional
 Alpha Epsilon Delta
 Phi Alpha Delta 2011
 Beta Beta Beta 1949
 Eta Sigma Phi
 Psi Chi

Lady of the Bracelet pageant
The Lady of the Bracelet pageant (commonly referred to as LOB) is a long-standing competition in which scholarships are awarded to female students. The first-place winner of the pageant is awarded the title of "Lady of the Bracelet" for one year.

The program is under the direction of the Director of Student Activities and the Assistant Director of Student Activities of Northwestern State University.  Contestants compete in several categories, including interview, evening wear, and swimsuit competition. In addition to being bestowed the title of "Lady of the Bracelet" for the following year, the first-place contestant receives a full scholarship and goes on to compete in the Miss Louisiana pageant, which can ultimately result in a berth to the Miss America pageant. It is traditionally held on the first Friday in February.

In the early 1920s, The Potpourri, Northwestern State's yearbook, sponsored the first beauty pageant held on the university campus. The contestants were selected from photographs submitted to well-known producers for judgment, and were chosen for their charm and beauty. In 1958, Miss Kahne Dipola was crowned the first Miss Lady of the Bracelet, and she received a gold bracelet to wear when she represented the university in public. Over the years, the bracelet has been passed down to each holder of the title.

Through the efforts of Mr. Robert W. Wilson Sr., the Student Union Governing Board purchased the first franchise from the Miss Louisiana Pageant in 1971, enabling Northwestern State's Lady of the Bracelet to enter the state contest. The Student Activities Board, formerly the Student Union Governing Board, has continued the tradition of sponsoring the Lady of the Bracelet Pageant for the enjoyment of the Northwestern State community. The Lady of the Bracelet pageant has gained state recognition for production, scholarship, and quality of contestants.

ROTC
With an agreement signed between Northwestern State College and the Department of the United States Army, an antiaircraft field artillery unit of the Reserve Officers Training Corps was established in the fall of 1950.  In August 1950, the building to house the ROTC unit was authorized.  The new military science program, under President Prather, enrolled its first students in the fall of 1950 with one officer and five enlisted men on the staff.  By the end of the 1950–51 academic year, 220 men had selected military training. 
In 1965, NSC under President Kyser signed an agreement with the Army stating that the Military Science Senior ROTC program would be provided with a university secretary, armory, and utilities. The NSU ROTC Department and the Joint Readiness Training Center at Fort Polk, Louisiana, mutually support Cadet Command by identifying quality soldiers with officer potential and in assisting them in transition from active duty under the college ROTC Green to Gold program. The NSU ROTC Demon Battalion has commissioned nearly 1000 second lieutenants into the United States Armed Services.  Quite a few graduates have become distinguished Army officers, including several general officers.

A hall of fame was begun in 1983.  Portraits and biographies of the hall of fame members are on permanent display in the ROTC office foyer. NSU ROTC cadets have been selected to attend specialty schools in Germany and at West Point.  Cadets have also participated in ceremonies commemorating the Bataan March, in New Mexico, and supporting the Habitat for Humanity and Loggers conventions; several renovation projects have been completed.  The cadets have been able to enjoy a TV lounge, kitchen area, and game room to include a billiards, ping pong, and foosball. Notably, five NSU ROTC commissioned officers have been inducted into NSU's highest Hall of Distinction, the Long Purple Line.

Archive
NSU maintains an archive through the Cammie G. Henry Research Center. Collections cover a diversity of individuals and topics. Materials may be accessed on such figures as Ethma Odum, the pioneering woman television personality at KALB-TV in Alexandria; James B. Aswell, Kate Chopin, Robert DeBlieux, Caroline Dormon, and the Cane River.

Notable alumni

 Larry Bagley (born 1949), Republican member of the Louisiana House of Representatives for District 7; graduate study in education at NSU
 Thomas "Bud" Brady (1938–2011), class of 1962, member of the Louisiana House of Representatives from La Salle Parish from 1976 to 1988; radio personality, real estate appraiser
 Henry Burns (born 1947), bakery owner and Republican former member of the Louisiana House of Representatives for Bossier Parish, obtained his bachelor of arts degree in upper elementary education from Northwestern State.
 Monnie T. Cheves (1902–1988, circa class of 1923), alumnus and NSU education professor, and member of the Louisiana House of Representatives from 1952 to 1960
 Charles Milton Cunningham (1877–1936), educator, attorney, publisher of The Natchitoches Times, and member of the Louisiana State Senate from 1915 to 1922
 Israel "Bo" Curtis (1932–2012), was an African-American Democrat member of the Louisiana House of Representatives from Alexandria from 1992 to 2008 and the Rapides Parish School Board from 1976 to 1992; received master's degree in education from NSU
 Jackson B. Davis (born 1918), former state senator from Shreveport; attended NSU from 1934 to 1935
 Joe Delaney, NFL running back for the Kansas City Chiefs and 1981 Rookie of the Year, who died in 1983 attempting to rescue three children from drowning.
 Herbert B. Dixon, African-American Democrat member of the Louisiana House of Representatives from Alexandria from 2008 to 2014; member of the Rapides Parish School Board from 1992 to 2008; received master's degree from NSU
 William J. "Bill" Dodd, former Louisiana Lieutenant Governor and Education Superintendent, graduated from then Louisiana Normal in 1934, the year that A.A. Fredericks became the president.
  Mark Duper, NFL Football Player, 80’s Miami Dolphins.
 Lindsey Evans, model, known for being in the music video Blurred Lines
 D'or Fischer (born 1981), Israeli-American basketball player in the Israeli National League
 Dan Flores, Natchitoches native and an historian of the American West, received his master of arts degree from NSU prior to 1980.
 Paul Lee Foshee Sr., retired crop duster, served in both houses of the Louisiana legislature, the House from 1960 to 1964 and the state Senate from 1972 to 1976.
 John B. Fournet, Speaker of the Louisiana House during the Huey Pierce Long Jr., impeachment case of 1929 and later lieutenant governor and associate and chief justice of the Louisiana Supreme Court, received his teaching degree from Northwestern State in 1915.
 H. M. "Mutt" Fowler, a former member of the Louisiana House of Representatives from Coushatta, dropped out of NSU in March 1941 to enter the US Army. 
 Gordon Gunter (1909–1998), bachelor of arts in zoology 1929, influential fisheries scientist who pioneered the study of fisheries in the northern Gulf of Mexico
 Robert Harling (born 1960), movie screenwriter, producer, and director
 Lance Harris (born 1961), Republican member of the Louisiana House of Representatives for Rapides Parish since 2012, attended NSU, dates unavailable
 Bobby Hebert, current New Orleans radio personality and former NFL quarterback for the New Orleans Saints and the Atlanta Falcons
 Donald Gray Horton (1945–2013), Demons football player and long-time president of the NSU Athletic Association, practiced law in Coushatta, and was half-owner of the Famous Natchitoches Louisiana Meat Pie Company.
 Carolyn Huntoon, scientist with NASA and the first woman director of the Johnson Space Center, received her undergraduate degree from NSU in 1962.
 Guy A. J. LaBoa, lieutenant general in the US Army who commanded the 4th Infantry Division and First United States Army
 Gerald Long, rare Republican member of the Long political dynasty.
 U.S. Representative and State Senator Speedy O. Long graduated with his bachelor's degree in history from NSU in 1951.  He later received his law degree from Louisiana State University in Baton Rouge.  Mr. Long was inducted posthumously into Northwestern State University's "Long Purple Line" on October 24, 2008. Northwestern State University established the Long Purple Line in 1990 to provide recognition and appreciation to former NS. students whose career accomplishments or service to their fellow man have enhanced the reputation of the university.
 John McConathy (1930–2016), NSU basketball player, professional basketball player, superintendent for the Bossier Parish School Board; son Mike McConathy, a Louisiana Tech graduate, has been the NSU basketball coach since 1999.
 Billy McCormack, Southern Baptist pastor in Shreveport, and one of four national directors of the Christian Coalition of America, received bachelor's and master's degrees from NSU.
 Garnie W. McGinty, Louisiana historian graduated from NSU and served as NSU president on a one-year interim basis. Most of his career was at Louisiana Tech University.
 Harry Middleton, famed outdoor writer.
 Newt V. Mills, U.S. representative from Louisiana's 5th congressional district from 1937 to 1943, studied professional education at NSU and taught in Morehouse Parish from 1921 to 1932.
 Randy Moffett, president of the University of Louisiana System  and formerly president of Southeastern Louisiana University received his master's degree from NSU.
 Sammy Joe Odom (1941–2001), football star at NSU in 1962 and 1963, later played with the Houston Oilers. At the time of his death, he was the administrator of the De Soto Parish Police Jury. He was among the 100 Top Football Players at NSU, as announced in July 2007 as part of the centennial celebration of the football team.
 Ed Orgeron played football at Northwestern State University after transferring from LSU in 1978.  He went on to be on coaching staffs at NSU, McNeese State University, University of Arkansas, University of Miami, Nicholls State University, Syracuse University, University of Southern California, University of Mississippi, the New Orleans Saints, and the University of Tennessee. Won a national championship as head coach of Louisiana State University in 2019
 Mary Evelyn Parker (class of 1941, 1920–2015) was state treasurer from 1968 to 1987.
Barry Rubin (born 1957), Head Strength and Conditioning Coach of the Kansas City Chiefs in the National Football League
 Joe R. Salter, former speaker of the Louisiana House from Sabine Parish and current lobbyist for the state Department of Education, graduated from NSU in 1965 and later received a master's degree from the institution.
 Kenneth Michael "Mike" Smith, former state senator (1996–2008) graduated from NSU in agribusiness in 1970. He is co-owner of P.K. Smith Motors in Winnfield.
 Victor T. "Vic" Stelly (born 1941), former Republican state representative from Calcasieu Parish and author of the Stelly Plan, received his bachelor of science in education from NSU in 1962.
 Raymond Strother, regional and national political consultant, attended NSU from 1958 to 1960.
 Ollie Tyler (graduate studies), mayor of Shreveport, former interim state superintendent of education, former Caddo Parish school superintendent 
 Darryl Willis (1991), BP vice president in charge of claims in the Deepwater Horizon oil spill, is featured in many BP commercials.
 Ernest Wooton (born 1941), state representative from Belle Chasse and an Independent candidate for the U.S. Senate in 2010, attended NSU.
 Successful athletic alumni are Terrence McGee, David Pittman, Craig Nall, Gary Reasons, Kenta Bell, Jackie Smith, Brian Lawrence, and Dennis Duncan.

Notable faculty and administrators
 James B. Aswell, president of NSU from 1908 to 1911, was the U.S. representative for Louisiana's 8th congressional district (since defunct) from 1913 until his death in office in 1931.
 Medford Bryan Evans (1907–1989), English professor and conservative activist, at NSU from 1955 to 1959
 Julie Kane (born 1952), poet
 Jay Luneau (born 1962), Alexandria lawyer and state senator; adjunct professor at NSU
 Ralph L. Ropp, professor of speech and head of the forensics department, 1923–1949; president of Louisiana Tech from 1949 to 1962

References

External links

 

 
Educational institutions established in 1884
Universities and colleges accredited by the Southern Association of Colleges and Schools
Education in Natchitoches Parish, Louisiana
Buildings and structures in Natchitoches, Louisiana
Universities and colleges in Shreveport, Louisiana
Education in Vernon Parish, Louisiana
Education in Rapides Parish, Louisiana
1884 establishments in Louisiana
Public universities and colleges in Louisiana